Ricardo Sánchez Herrero (born 4 December 1992) is a Spanish field hockey player who plays as a defender for Club de Campo and the Spanish national team.

Club career
Complutense was the only club he ever played for until he moved to Belgium to play for Leuven in 2016. In 2018, he switched to another Belgian club Gantoise. After one season with Gantoise, he returned to Complutense. In June 2020 it was announced he left Complutense for the other Madrid-based club Club de Campo. In his second season at the club, Club de Campo won their first ever Spanish national title.

International career
Sánchez made his debut for the senior national team in November 2014 in a test match against Great Britain. Initially, he was not selected for the 2018 World Cup but he replaced Miquel Delas later in the tournament who had to withdraw injured. At the 2019 EuroHockey Championship, he won his first medal with the national team as they finished second. On 25 May 2021, he was selected in the squad for the 2021 EuroHockey Championship.

References

External links

1992 births
Living people
Spanish male field hockey players
Male field hockey defenders
Field hockey players at the 2020 Summer Olympics
Olympic field hockey players of Spain
2018 Men's Hockey World Cup players
División de Honor de Hockey Hierba players
Men's Belgian Hockey League players
Expatriate field hockey players
Spanish expatriate sportspeople in Belgium
Field hockey players from Madrid
KHC Leuven players
Club de Campo Villa de Madrid players